Boone is a Dutch surname, from the Middle Dutch bone or boene meaning 'bean' or 'someone who farmed beans'. It is found in the United States more than any other country in the world, and found in Belgium more than any country in Europe. Notable people with the surname include: 

Aaron Boone (born 1973), American professional baseball player and manager
Bob Boone, former baseball player, coach and manager
Brendon Boone, American actor and writer
Bret Boone, baseball player
Daneen Boone, Canadian actress
Daniel Boone (disambiguation), Dan or Daniel, multiple uses
David Boone, Canadian Football League player
David Sheldon Boone, American-born Soviet spy
Debby Boone,  singer and daughter of Pat Boone
Eunetta T. Boone (1955–2019), American television writer and producer
Fernand Boone (1934–2013), Belgian footballer
Herman Boone (1935–2019), American football coach
Ilsley Boone, former head of the first naturist organization in the U.S.
Jack Boone (1918–1984), American college sports coach
Joel Thompson Boone, World War I Medal of Honor recipient
John William Boone, American ragtime musician
Josh Boone, basketball player
Laurence Boone, French economist
Levi Boone, Daniel's nephew and a mayor of Chicago in the 1850s
Mark Boone Junior, American actor
Megan Boone, American actress
Mike Boone, American football player
Pat Boone (born 1934), American singer, actor and writer
Pete Boone (living), the former athletics director for the University of Mississippi
Richard Boone, American actor
Richard Bently Boone, American jazz musician
Ron Boone, professional basketball player
Squire Boone, Daniel's brother and an important figure in American history
Sylvia Ardyn Boone (1941–1993), American art historian

References

Norman-language surnames